Sphaerolobium nudiflorum is a species of flowering plant in the family Fabaceae and is endemic to the south-west of Western Australia.

It was first formally described in 1864 by George Bentham in Flora Australiensis. The specific epithet (racemulosum) means "having a small raceme".

Sphaerolobium racemulosum grows in swampy areas, near rivers and on slopes in the Esperance Plains, Jarrah Forest and Warren bioregions of south-western Western Australia and is listed as "not threatened" by the Government of Western Australia Department of Biodiversity, Conservation and Attractions.

References 

racemulosum
Fabales of Australia
Eudicots of Western Australia
Plants described in 1864
Taxa named by George Bentham